The Jordanian ambassador in Madrid is the representative of the government in Amman (Jordan) to the government of Spain.

List of representatives

.

References 

 
Spain
Jordan